The Testing of Mildred Vane is a lost 1918 silent film drama directed by Wilfred Lucas who was famous for being in front of the camera rather than behind it. It stars May Allison and was produced and distributed by Metro Pictures.

Cast
 May Allison - Mildred Vane
 Darrell Foss - Albert Moreland
 George Field - Dr. Miguel Hernandez
 Nigel De Brulier - Matthew Vane
 Fred Goodwins - Ralph Jeffries

References

External links
 
 
 1918 Metro Ad

1918 films
Lost American films
American silent feature films
Films directed by Wilfred Lucas
Metro Pictures films
Silent American drama films
1918 drama films
American black-and-white films
1919 drama films
1919 films
1910s lost films
Lost drama films
1910s American films
1910s English-language films